Man-portable radar is a lightweight surveillance radar system that does not require vehicle support to transport or operate. Man-portable radar was developed to introduce radar to remote areas where vehicle support is not feasible.

Examples

PPE PGSR-3i ‘Beagle’

PPE PGSR-3i ‘Beagle’ is a unique lightweight man-portable radar by Pro Patria Electronics, which is capable of intercepting, detecting and tracking targets moving on or close to the ground. It can also classify and differentiate targets based on their size and movement characteristics. 

PPE PGSR-3i ‘Beagle’ can operate on standard Bren Tronics military batteries as well as from a vehicle or mains power source. 

PPE PGSR-3i ‘Beagle’ can scan from 11 to 360 degrees with a continuous 360 degree scanning.

PPE PGSR-3i ‘Beagle’ has automatic and manual doppler audio mode, artillery correction mode, continuous 360 degree scanning mode. Has detection ranges of 40 km for very large vehicles 25 km for vehicles, 10 km for pedestrians. IT has an 5 minute setup time, it can be deployed very quickly. It works with FMCW radar technology, so it has a very low probability of intercept. IT has its DSP integrated, so it can even be used with a suitable ruggedized tablet.

Blighter B202 Mk 2

The Blighter B202 Mk 2 radar from Blighter Surveillance Systems (a Plextek Group company) is an advanced E-Scan radar with no moving parts for high reliability in the field. Its weight is about 15 kg and is therefore truly man portable, about the weight of a machine gun and less than half the weight of other man-portable radars. 

Blighter B202 Mk 2 can operate off small batteries, unlike others in its class which are really vehicle bounded. Blighter B202 Mk 2 is phase coherent and has very low probability of intercept due to its very low peak power. 

Blighter B202 Mk 2 also includes high-quality Doppler audio and is a "Multi-Mode and Multi-Role" radar. The modes including radar modes for quick scan ('Vortex Fast-Scan') with audio for fast search and long dwell modes small scan for high probability of detection of crawlers also can be used with Doppler audio for target recognition. Most suited to covert ops and border surveillance as multiple Blighter radars can coordinate in ad hoc networks and sequence their radar emissions to form border surveillance over very long lines of control ('Blighter MultiWatch').

MSTAR

Man-portable Surveillance and Target Acquisition Radar (MSTAR) provides long-range, wide-area surveillance and detection in an over-watch capability. The weight is about 30 kg.

SpotterRF

SpotterRF Compact Surveillance Radar (SpotterRF) is a new class of surveillance radar called Compact Surveillance Radar that provides range and azimuth measurements of moving objects. It tracks moving people and vehicles from 500 to 1500 meters away in a small, lightweight package. Different variants of the system range from 3 to 5 pounds. SpotterRF systems are easy to use and only require 30–60 minutes (according to SpotterRF's marketing material) to train personnel on how to use the system. SpotterRF systems can also integrate with programs such as Exacqvision, Milestone, VideoNext, RaptorX, and Google Earth for an effective and easy visual experience. Combined with SpotterRF's radar management system, NetworkedIO, systems can actively cue cameras on moving targets spotted by the system. Compact Surveillance Radar (CSR) applies the technology used in the telecommunications industry to reduce the size, weight and cost of radar..

References

External links

 Blighter B202 Mk 2 E-Scan Radar Blighter(tm) B202 Mk 2 E-Scan Radar Information
 Blighter Video Blighter(tm) E-Scan Radar Video

Radar